Suristan was used as a name in two senses during the Sassanid Persian Empire 226 to 651 AD.
It was used to designate the Persian province of Surestan, roughly the same as today's Syria, as opposed to Asuristan, which was a separate province corresponding to Babylonia (central-southern Iraq). It was also the name of the Sassanid city of Surestan (today's Kufa in Iraq), situated in the Persian province of Middle Bih-Kavad.

See also
Syria (Roman province)

Provinces of the Sasanian Empire